Búrfellshyrna is a mountain in the Svarfaðardalur in northern Iceland. It is made of basaltic layers of Tertiary age.  It reaches 1,091 meters at its highest peak. It is situated between the valleys of Búrfellsdalur and Grýtudalur. In Búrfellsdalur is the Búrfell Glacier, which exhibits what is sometimes referred to as a glacier surge. Farms surrounding Búrfellshyrna include Búrfell and Hæringsstaðir.

References

Tierra.Meteored

Mountains of Iceland
One-thousanders of Iceland